New Mexico State Road 114 (NM 114) is a  state highway in Roosevelt County, New Mexico.

Route description
NM 114 begins at an intersection with U.S. Route 70 (US 70) and NM 330 in Elida. The highway travels in a southern direction along the town's eastern edge and turns east at County Road 22 and leaves the town. The highway travels through largely rural areas and runs through the town of Dora, intersecting NM 206. NM 114 turns back south at County Road F and runs through Causey, intersecting with NM 321 and NM 458. The highway turns back east at County Road E south of Lingo. NM 114 ends at the Texas state line, with the highway continuing into Texas as SH 114.

Major intersections

See also

References

114
Transportation in Roosevelt County, New Mexico